Prague is a 1992 British drama film directed by Ian Sellar. It was screened in the Un Certain Regard section at the 1992 Cannes Film Festival.

Cast
 Alan Cumming as Alexander Novak
 Sandrine Bonnaire as Elena
 Bruno Ganz as Josef
 Raphael Meiss as Ralph
 Henri Meiss as Paul
 Hana Gregorová as Jana
 Petr Jákl as Policeman
 Ljuba Skorepová as Neighbour
 Zdena Kecliková as Cleaner on the train
 Lubos Kafka as Boatman
 Jaroslav Jodl as Cleaner in the vaults
 Ladislav Lahoda as Barman

References

External links

1992 films
1992 drama films
British drama films
Films shot in the Czech Republic
1990s English-language films
1990s British films